Celerino Sánchez Pérez (3 February 1944 – 1 May 1992) was a Mexican professional baseball third baseman. He played in MLB for the New York Yankees.

Career 
Sánchez starred as a baseball player in the Mexican League from 1964 to 1971, primarily with the Tigres del México, before joining the New York Yankees organization in 1972.  After spending a few months with the Yankees' minor league affiliate, the Syracuse Chiefs, Sánchez joined the Yankees on June, 1972, and was the Yankees regular third baseman for the rest of the year. In 1973, the Yankees' acquisition of star third baseman Graig Nettles relegated him to a backup role. 1973 was Sánchez' final year in the Major Leagues.

Sanchez hit his only career home run at Yankee Stadium on May 12, 1973 against Mickey Scott of the Baltimore Orioles. He returned to the Mexican Leagues in 1976, where he played for several more years before retiring in 1979.

Sánchez was elected to the Mexican Professional Baseball Hall of Fame in 1994.

References

External links

1944 births
1992 deaths
Asheville Tourists players
Bravos de León players
Cafeteros de Córdoba players
Greensboro Patriots players
Major League Baseball players from Mexico
Major League Baseball third basemen
Mexican Baseball Hall of Fame inductees
Mexican League baseball players
Mexican expatriate baseball players in the United States
Mineros de Coahuila players
New York Yankees players
Syracuse Chiefs players
Piratas de Campeche players
Tigres de Salamanca players
Tigres del México players
Baseball players from Veracruz